Hindsiclava consors is a species of sea snail, a marine gastropod mollusk in the family Pseudomelatomidae, the turrids and allies.

Description
The length of the shell attains 40 mm.

Distribution
This marine species occurs off Venezuela. Fossils have been found in the Gurabo Formation, Santo Domingo, and in the Bowden Formation, Japaica; Springvale Formation, Trinidad; Punta Gavilan Formation, Venezuela; Limon Formation, Costa Rica and in the Gatun Formation, Costa Rica and Panama.

References

External links
 Petuch, Relict Caenogastropods; Malacologia v.20 (1980-1981)

consors
Gastropods described in 1850